Eliza Monique Campbell (born 16 May 1995) is an Australian international women's soccer player who currently plays for Sydney FC in A-League Women (formerly W-League). She has previously played for Australian teams Newcastle Jets, Adelaide United and Perth Glory. Between 2014 and 2016, Campbell played for Medkila and Klepp in the Norwegian Toppserien. Campbell has played for the Australia women's national soccer team.

Playing career

Club career
Campbell began playing at the age of seven in Bilambil.

As a 17-year-old, Campbell made her W-League debut for the Newcastle Jets in October 2012. 

In 2014, Campbell joined Medkila in the Norwegian Toppserien. After two seasons, she joined fellow Norwegian club Klepp.

Ahead of the 2016–17 W-League, Campbell joined Adelaide United.

After spending two season at Adelaide United, Campbell signed with Perth Glory for the 2018-19 W-League Season.

In March 2021, she joined Sydney FC as an injury replacement player for Katie Offer.

International career
In 2013, Campbell was called up for the Australia women's national soccer team, sitting on the bench for a match against China in Wollongong.

Campbell made her international debut on 22 November 2017, against China.

References

1995 births
Living people
Australian women's soccer players
Australia women's international soccer players
Newcastle Jets FC (A-League Women) players
Perth Glory FC (A-League Women) players
Sydney FC (A-League Women) players
Klepp IL players
Adelaide United FC (A-League Women) players
Women's association football goalkeepers
Australian expatriate women's soccer players
Toppserien players
Australian expatriate sportspeople in Norway
Expatriate women's footballers in Norway
Medkila IL (women) players